The 1994–95 CF Monterrey season is the 49th campaign in existence and 36th consecutive season in the top flight division of Mexican football.

Summary
In summertime the club appointed Chilean Arturo Salah as its new head coach. Also chairman Jorge Lankenau  reinforced the squad with several players such as: Chilean Forward Anibal Gonzalez, Argentine Striker Roberto Gasparini, midfielder Roberto Medina and centre back defender Juan de Dios Ramirez Perales. The offensive line with just 37 goals collapsed to the second worst of the entire league (only ahead of local archrivals Tigres UANL) with Careca, Verdirame scoring only 8 goals, while Mario Jauregui scored 7 goals, on the contrary, new arrivals Gonzalez and Gasparini were null. It was the defensive line lead by goalkeeper Ruben Ruiz Diaz which levered up the team to the Repechaje -ahead of Leon and Atlas FC in the mediocre group 4- only to be defeated by Incumbent Champions Tecos UAG despite won the first match of the series 2-0 the next game the squad lost by the same score being eliminated due to its 11th spot on the overall table.

Squad

Transfers

Winter

Competitions

La Liga

League table

Group 1

General table

Results by round

Matches

Repechaje

References

External links

1994–95 Mexican Primera División season
1994–95 in Mexican football